Sericinus is a genus of swallowtail butterflies placed in the subfamily Parnassiinae. The genus has a complex history and a multiplicity of names have been applied to its single species.

Sericinus montela, the dragon swallowtail, is the only species, making the genus monotypic. It is found in the Russian Far East, Korea, China and Japan.

Taxonomy
See Notes below for abbreviations used
Sericinus Westwood, 1851 (Transactions of the Entomological Society of London. NS I: 173), monobasic
telamon Donovan (Sericinus Wood, 1877: Suicinus Draesecke, 1923) montela Gray, 1853.
 
Subspecies manchurica (Bang-Haas (i.l.) van Rosen, 1929 (North China: South Manchuria) 
Form roseni Bryk, 1932 gen. vern.
Form manschuricus van Rosen gen. aest.
Form cellopura
Form posterior exsubcostalis (!) Eisner, 1974
Form binaria Bryk
Form minusculus Eisner, 1962
Form nigricans Eisner, 1962
Form minima Eisner, 1962
Subspecies amurensis Staudinger, 1892 (East U.S.S.R., Amurland-Ussuri)

Form telemachus Staudinger, 1892 gen. vern.
Form amurensis Staudingers gen. vest.
Form minusculus Eisner, 1962
Subspecies eisneri Bryk 1932 North East Korea (probably amurensis) gen. vern. not described.
Form eisneri Bryk gen. aest.
Form binaria Eisner, 1962
Form unaria Eisner, 1962 !
Subspecies koreana Fixsen, 1887 (melanogramma Bryk, 1846) Korea
Form fixseni Staudinger, 1892 gen. vern.
Form koreanus Fix. gen. aest.
Form grayi Fixsen, 1887
Form grundi Eisner, 1962
Form binaria Eisner, 1962
Form strandi Bryk 1913
Form flavomaculata Eisner, 1962
Form minusculus Eisner, 1962
Form magna Eisner
Form rubrocatenata Eisner
Form posteriorsubmarginalisinterrupta (!) Eisner, 1974
Subspecies montela Gray, 1852 (telamon Donovan, 1798: hoenei Hering), (Central and North China - Peking, Nanking, Chekiang, Shanghai)

Form strandi Bryk, 1913
Form telmona Gray 1852 gen. vern. (hoenei Bryk, 1932)
Form telmononula Bryk
Form ruth Eisner, 1962
Form montela Gray, 1852 gen. aest.
Form cellopura Eisner, 1954
Form cellopurissima Eisner, 1954
Form elegantissima Eisner, 1954
Form flavomaculata Eisner, 1954
Form miniuscula Eisner, 1962
Form binaria Eisner, 1962
Form nigricans Eisner, 1962
Form eva Bryk and Eisner, 1935
Form absurdus Bryk, 1913 (West China, South Shantung, Lau shan, Tientsin)
Subspecies elegans Bryk, 1913 (leechi Rothschild, 1918) (West China)
Form  telmona Gray gen. vern.
Form elegans Bryk gen. aest.
Form strandi Bryk, 1913
Form leechi Rothschild, 1918
Form cressoni Reakirt
Subspecies anderssoni Bryk, 1941 (Central China: Hupei anderssoni Bryk, gen. aest.
Subspecies magnus Fruhstorfer, 1913 (South China: Kiangsi, Liu- kiang
Subspecies kansuensis Eisner, 1962 (China: Kansu, Tsinglingshan, Szetchwan)
Subspecies shantungensis Hering, 1935 (China: Shantung)
Form cellopurissima Eisner, 1954
Form binaria Eisner, 1962
Form rubrocatenata Eisner, 1962
Form quadripicta Eisner, 1962
Form elegantissima Eisner, 1954

Notes
monobasic = founded containing a single species, same as "monotypic" if no more species are added
gen. vern. = vernalis, genetically determined spring generation
gen. aest. = aestivus, genetically determined summer generation
gen. vest. = genetically determined vestigial form
(!) = nomen collectivum, a nomenclatural/descriptive term incorrectly used by Curt Eisner in a taxonomic sense (infrasubspecific)
i.l. = in litteris, correspondence, not published

References

Bryk, F. (1913) Neue Parnassiiden-Formen aus dem Zoologischen Museum zu Berlin.Archiv für Naturgeschichte (A) 79 (3): 1-3; pl. 1 [partim].
Bryk, F. (1932) Neue Zerynthiinae Parnassiana 2 (6-8): 102-104.
Donovan, E. (1798) An Epitome of the natural History of the Insects of China.E. Donovan, London.
Eisner, C. 1954 (Parnassiana nova): III. Einige neue Formen in der Familie der Parnassiidae Zoologische Mededelingen 33 (8): 55-57
Eisner, C. (1962) Parnassiana nova XXXII. Nachträgliche Betrachtungen zu der Revision der Subfamilie Parnassiinae (Fortsetzung 5).Zoologische Mededelingen 38 (7): 105-128.
Fixsen, C. (1887) Lepidoptera aus Korea .Mémoires sur les Lépidoptères 3: 233-356, pls 13-15, 1 map
Gray, G. R. (1852) On the Species of the Genus Sericinus. Proceedings of the Zoological Society of London 1852: 70-73
Hering, M. (1935) Neue Unterarten von Sericinus telamon (Donov.)  Internationale Entomologische Zeitschrift 29 (17): 193-195
von Rosen, K. (1929). Papilio. In (A. Seitz ed.) The Macrolepidoptera of the World. The Palearctic Butterflies. Alfred Kernen. Stuttgart. Suppl. 1 : 7-20. 
Rothschild, [W.] (1918) Catalogue of Zerynthiinae and allied genera in the Tring Museum, with critical notes., Novitates Zoologicae 25: 64-75.
Staudinger, O. (1892) Die Macrolepidopteren des Amurgebietes. I. Theil. Rhopalocera, Sphinges, Bombyces, Sphinges  Mémoires sur les Lépidoptères 6: 83-658
Ackery, P.R., 1975. A guide to the genera and species of Parnassiinae (Lepidoptera: Papilionidae). Bulletin of the British Museum (Natural History) Entomology. 31: 71-105, plates 1-15.pdf

External links
Tree of Life
Swallowtails from China

Papilionidae
Taxa named by John O. Westwood
Butterfly genera